Irene Azuela (born October 27, 1979) is a British-born Mexican actress and producer.

Career 
Irene Azuela began her career as an actress in 2000's in TV Azteca with three telenovelas: Todo por amor, Amores querer con alevosía and La otra mitad del sol. She began to make films in 2007 in the film El búfalo de la noche, written by Guillermo Arriaga. In 2008 she won as best actress in the Ariel Awards for the film Quemar las Naves. She was the producer of the Canal Once series, Paramedicos. She has participated in several theater plays such as: La Gaviota, Salomé and La obra sangrienta written by Oscar Wilde.

Personal life 
Azuela has a daughter, born on March 13, 2015, with her current partner Enrique "Quique" Rangel, bass player of Café Tacuba.

Filmography

Awards and nominations

References

External links

1979 births
Ariel Award winners
Living people
Mexican telenovela actresses
Mexican telenovela producers
Mexican film actresses
21st-century Mexican actresses
Actresses from Mexico City